Giuseppe Bonomi (born January 3, 1912 in Alzano Lombardo – December 25, 1992) was an Italian professional football player coach.

He played for a few seasons for Atalanta B.C. and then was bought by A.S. Roma for a sum that was very high at the time, 120,000 lire. He was key midfielder for Roma for a few seasons, including their championship 1941/42 campaign.

Overall, he played for 6 seasons (143 games, 7 goals) in the Serie A for Atalanta and Roma.

Honours
 Serie A champion: 1941/42.

References

External links

1912 births
1992 deaths
Italian footballers
Serie A players
Serie B players
Calcio Lecco 1912 players
Atalanta B.C. players
A.S. Roma players
Italian football managers
Atalanta B.C. managers
Association football midfielders